Matt O'Donnell (born May 31, 1972) joined WPVI-TV in 1996 as a general assignment reporter. In 2004, he was promoted to the morning anchor position with Sarah Bloomquist and currently anchors the morning newscast with Tamala Edwards, who joined the news team in 2005.

External links
Channel 6 Action News Matt O'Donnell Bio Page
Channel 6 Action News Morning Team

American television journalists
Television anchors from Philadelphia
Philadelphia television reporters
1972 births
Living people
University of Delaware alumni
American male journalists